Abraham Lincoln  (1809–1865) was the president of the United States from 1861 to 1865.

Abraham Lincoln may also refer to:

Film and theatre
Abraham Lincoln (play), a 1918 play by John Drinkwater
Abraham Lincoln (1924 film short), a film by J. Searle Dawley
Abraham Lincoln (1924 film), an American feature film 
Abraham Lincoln (1930 film), a biographical film by D. W. Griffith

Literature
Abraham Lincoln (Parin d'Aulaire book), a 1939 book
Abraham Lincoln (Morse books), an 1893 biography by John T. Morse

People
Abraham Lincoln (captain) (1744–1786), grandfather of President Lincoln
Abe Lincoln (musician) (1907–2000), American Dixieland jazz trombonist

Statues
 List of statues of Abraham Lincoln

Other uses
Abraham Lincoln (Healy), an 1869 oil-on-canvas painting by George Peter Alexander Healy
Abraham Lincoln (train), a passenger train operated by the Baltimore and Ohio Railroad from 1935 into the 1960s
Abraham Lincoln (Pullman car), a train car
USS Abraham Lincoln (CVN-72), a 1988 aircraft carrier
USS Abraham Lincoln (SSBN-602), a 1960 submarine
Abraham Lincoln, a song from the Disney Channel TV series The Ghost and Molly McGee

See also
Abe (given name)
Abraham (given name)
Abraham Lincoln High School (disambiguation)
Lincoln (name)

Lincoln, Abraham